Băbeni is a town located in Vâlcea County, Romania. The town, elevated to that status in 2002, administers six villages: Bonciu, Capu Dealului, Pădurețu, Români, Tătărani and Valea Mare. It is situated in the historical region of Oltenia.

Notable people
 Romany Marie

References

Populated places in Vâlcea County
Towns in Romania
Localities in Oltenia